Mohamed Al-Agha (born 1 March 1984) is a businessman of a Turkish father and an Egyptian mother. He is the founder of Al-Agha Company in 1995 and the founder of Al-Agha Group in 2013. At the end of the century 2022, he won the Order of the Rising Sun from the Japanese government.

Early life 

He was born on 1 March 1984 in Egypt. He started his life from the age of eight, like a boy, with a merchant of household appliances, and he loved trade, and then he resorted to the art of installing the shower, when he was twelve years old, and he excelled in updating and decoding encrypted channels. Qus Center.

External links 

 List of companies of Egypt
 Economy of Egypt.

See also 

There are also people who have received the Order of the Rising Sun from several countries.

 Zahi Hawass
 Mahmoud El-Araby
 Saitō Makoto
 Laurent Pic
 Ōyama Iwao
 Matahiko Oshima
 Bolesław Orliński
 Chikage Oogi
 Ralph T. Browning
 Chang Hsueh-liang
 Kanaye Nagasawa
 Ken Naganuma
 Den Kenjirō
 Dewa Shigetō
 Karl Ludwig d'Elsa
 Paul von Bruns
 Ben Nighthorse Campbell
 Mohamed Bolkiah, Prince of Brunei
 Charles Hastings Judd
 Kabayama Sukenori
 José Antonio Abreu.

Brief 

Muhammad Al-Agha is of Turks in Egypt, and he is a charitable man with charitable works. In the year 29 May 2022, say, I and my company are under the command of any orphan bride.

The secret of his success 

Muhammad al-Agha or Muhammad al-Agha Qus He was called Muhammad al-Agha Qus because he was born in Qus in 1984 and he was struggling for a living and despite the fact that his mother's conditions were easy and he did not depend on his mother's capital he relied on himself and he was a secret like a fighter and the reason for his success is ambition and dear self He was advising the youth of the city of Qus to fight and fight to succeed.

References 

EgyptAir
20th-century Egyptian businesspeople
21st-century Egyptian businesspeople
Egyptian business executives
Egyptian company founders
Coptic businesspeople
Egyptian industrialists
Egyptian newspaper publishers (people)
1984 births
Recipients of the Order of the Rising Sun
Egyptians got it Order of the Rising Sun
People from Qus
Egyptian people of Turkish descent
Living people